Frances Alice Adaskin,  (née Marr; August 23, 1900March 8, 2001) was a Canadian pianist.

Biography
Adaskin was born Frances Alice Marr in Ridgetown, Ontario. She was the daughter of Del and Eunice Marr and the eldest of three siblings. She also began playing the piano at an early age under the direction of Whitney Scherer. She studied at the Alma College and, later, at the Conservatory of Music under Paul Wells.

In 1923, her first engagement as a professional accompanist was with violinist Harry Adaskin (died April 7, 1994). They became a duo and wed in 1926. The couple travelled until 1938 on tour of North America and Europe with the Hart House String Quartet.

Adaskin was also an entertainment writer (mostly of short stories). Many of her works were published in Saturday Night Magazine throughout the 1940s.  She also completed her unpublished memoirs, titled Fran's Scrapbook: A Talking Dream.

National Honours
Adaskin received the Order of Canada honour on December 15, 1976. It was awarded for "...a life devoted to music as accompanist of international repute and as a soloist and teacher..." She was invested as a Member on April 29, 1977.

Death
Frances Adaskin died in Vancouver on March 8, 2001, aged 100.

References
Notes

Citations

1900 births
2001 deaths
People from Chatham-Kent
Canadian centenarians
Members of the Order of Canada
Canadian music educators
Canadian women pianists
Musicians from Toronto
20th-century Canadian pianists
20th-century Canadian women musicians
Women music educators
Women centenarians
Women classical pianists
20th-century women pianists